1795 in sports describes the year's events in world sport.

Boxing
Events
 15 April — "Gentleman" John Jackson defeated Daniel Mendoza in nine rounds at Hornchurch to claim the Championship of England. Jackson did not defend the title and retired in 1796.

Cricket
Events
 Lord Frederick Beauclerk ended his studies at the University of Cambridge to become a full-time cricketer for the next thirty seasons; although he was an outstanding player, he is one of the most controversial figures in the sport's history.
England
 Most runs – John Hammond 800
 Most wickets – Thomas Boxall 60

Horse racing
England
 The Derby – Spread Eagle
 The Oaks – Platina
 St Leger Stakes – Hambletonian

References

 
1795